Jacqueline "Jackie" Parry (born 12 July 1996) is an Australian rules footballer who plays for Geelong in the AFL Women's (AFLW). She has previously played for Melbourne.

AFLW career
In October 2019, Parry was drafted by Melbourne.

In June 2022, Parry was traded alongside Shelley Scott to Geelong in exchange for Jordan Ivey and pick 51.

References

External links

 

Living people
1996 births
Melbourne Football Club (AFLW) players
Australian rules footballers from the Australian Capital Territory
Sportswomen from the Australian Capital Territory